Samuel Sugden, FRS was an eminent chemist in the first half of the 20th century.

Early life
He was born in Leeds on 21 February 1892 and educated at Batley Grammar School and the Royal College of Science.

Career
After war time service with the BEF he was a Research Chemist the Royal Arsenal, Woolwich following which he became a Lecturer, Reader then Professor of Physical chemistry at Birkbeck College. In 1934 he was elected a Fellow of the Royal Society and in 1937  became Professor of Physical Chemistry at  University College, London. When World War II returned  he joined the newly formed Ministry of Supply  but resigned in 1944 to take up a similar post with the United States Air Force Eighth Air Force. A noted author, he died on 20 October 1950.

Notes

1892 births
Scientists from Yorkshire
People educated at Batley Grammar School
Alumni of the Royal College of Science
British Army personnel of World War I
Academics of Birkbeck, University of London
Academics of University College London
Fellows of the Royal Society
1950 deaths
English physical chemists